King's Highway 148, commonly referred to as Highway 148, is a provincially maintained highway in Ontario, Canada. The highway acts as an extension of Route 148 in Quebec, once connecting it with Highway 17, the Trans-Canada Highway, near Pembroke. It was shortened to its present terminus in 1997, and now connects downtown Pembroke to the provincial border. Highway 148 follows a route that was once part of Highway 17 and Highway 62 until the Pembroke Bypass opened in 1982.

The  route of Highway 148 takes it along the Ontario shoreline of the Ottawa River from the outskirts of Pembroke to the opposite shore at L'Isle-aux-Allumettes, where it crosses the river into Quebec. The section of the highway within Pembroke is locally maintained under a Connecting Link agreement.

Route description 

However, its length was truncated on April 1, 1997 when the province downloaded responsibility for the portion from Highway 17 to Boundary Street.
At that time, the connecting link status of Highway 148 through Pembroke itself was revised, and the current signed terminus of the highway is now Mackay Street, which was formerly Highway 41.
Approximately 11,400 vehicles drive along Highway 148 on an average day, with just under half that many crossing from or into Quebec.

From there, the route travels southeast through the urban-rural fringe of the city, passing east of two large shopping complexes. After passing west of the community of Pleasant View, the route enters a rural area and curves south alongside farmland.

At a four-way stop with channelized right turn lanes, drivers must turn to remain on the highway. To the south is Renfrew County Road 40, which continues to Highway 17 at the southern end of the Pembroke Bypass. Highway 148 continues east, crossing the Ottawa Valley Railway and the entrance to Hazley Bay before entering the community of Cotnam Island. The highway curves northeast and crosses the Ottawa River, entering Quebec midspan.

History 

Highway 148 follows the route of what was the northernmost section of Highway 62, prior to the opening of the Pembroke Bypass. Highway 17 was also signed concurrently with Highway 62 between Trafalgar Road and Renfrew County Road 40, as it followed the Ottawa River in the Pembroke area at that time.
On September 10, 1982, the Pembroke Bypass was ceremoniously opened to traffic, diverting Highway 17 to the west.
In the process, Highway 62 was truncated at the new bypass; the removed section was redesignated Highway 148, giving it the same number as the route in Quebec that it served to connect with the Trans-Canada Highway.
However, its length was truncated on April 1, 1997 when the province downloaded responsibility for the portions between Highway 17 and Highway 41 to the Town of Pembroke and County of Renfrew. The Pembroke Connecting Link agreement shares the responsibility for Highway 41 northeast of Highway 17 and for Highway 148 from Highway 41 to Cedar Lane between the province and the town.

Major intersections

References 

148